The Parthian language, also known as Arsacid Pahlavi and Pahlawānīg, is an extinct ancient Northwestern Iranian language once spoken in Parthia, a region situated in present-day northeastern Iran and Turkmenistan. Parthian was the language of state of the Arsacid Parthian Empire (248 BC – 224 AD), as well as of its eponymous branches of the Arsacid dynasty of Armenia, Arsacid dynasty of Iberia, and the Arsacid dynasty of Caucasian Albania.

Parthian had a significant impact on Armenian, a large part of whose vocabulary was formed primarily from borrowings from Parthian, and had a derivational morphology and syntax that was also affected by language contact but to a lesser extent. Many ancient Parthian words were preserved and now survive only in Armenian. The Semnani or Komisenian languages may descend from Parthian directly or be a Caspian language with Parthian influences, but the topic lacks sufficient research.

Classification
Parthian was a Western Middle Iranian language. Language contact made it share some features of Eastern Iranian languages, the influence of which is attested primarily in loanwords. Some traces of Eastern influence survive in Parthian loanwords in Armenian. Parthian loanwords appear in everyday Armenian vocabulary; nouns, adjectives, adverbs, denominative verbs, and administrative and religious lexicons.

Taxonomically, Parthian, an Indo-European language, belongs to the Northwestern Iranian language group while Middle Persian belongs to the Southwestern Iranian language group.

Written Parthian

The Parthian language was rendered using the Pahlavi writing system, which had two essential characteristics. Firstly, its script derived from Aramaic, the script (and language) of the Achaemenid chancellery (Imperial Aramaic). Secondly, it had a high incidence of Aramaic words, which are rendered as ideograms or logograms; they were written Aramaic words but pronounced as Parthian ones (See Arsacid Pahlavi for details).

The Parthian language was the language of the old Satrapy of Parthia and was used in the Arsacids courts. The main sources for Parthian are the few remaining inscriptions from Nisa and Hecatompylos, Manichaean texts, Sasanian multilingual inscriptions and remains of Parthian literature in the succeeding Middle Persian. The later Manichaean texts, composed shortly after the demise of the Parthian power, play an important role for reconstructing the Parthian language. Those Manichaean manuscripts contain no ideograms.

Attestations
Attestations of the Parthian language include:

Some 3,000 ostraca (ca. 100–29 BC) found in Nisā in southern Turkmenistan.
A first century AD parchment dealing with a land-sale from Awraman in Western Iran.
The first century BC ostraca from Shahr-e Qumis in Eastern Iran.
The poem Draxt i Asurig
Inscription on the coins of Arsacid Kings in the first century AD.
The bilingual inscription of Seleucia on the Tigris (150–151 AD).
The inscription of Ardavan V found in Susa (215).
Some third century documents discovered in Dura-Europos, On the Euphrates.
The inscription at Kal-e Jangal, near Birjand in South Khorasan (first half of third century or later).
The inscriptions of early Sassanian Kings and priests in Parthian including Ka'ba-ye Zartosht near Shiraz and Paikuli in Iraqi Kurdistan.
The vast corpus of Manichaean Parthian which do not contain any ideograms.
 In North Pakistan, Indo-Parthian culture in Taxila with Gondophares 20 BC–10 BC and Abdagases, Bajaur, Bajaur, Khyber-Pakhtunkhwa and down in to Sistan, Balochistan.

Samples 
This sample of Parthian literature is taken from a Manichaean text fragment:

Differences from Middle Persian 
Although Parthian was quite similar to Middle Persian in many aspects, we can still observe clear differences in lexical, morphological and phonological forms. In the text above, the following forms can be noticed:

 ⟨āγad⟩, came, instead of Middle Persian ⟨āyad⟩.
 ⟨wāxt⟩, said, instead of ⟨gōft⟩. This form for the verb to say can still be found in many contemporary Northwestern Iranian languages, e.g. Mazandarani ⟨vātεn⟩, Zazaki ⟨vatış; vaten⟩ or Sorani (wotin). It is also common in Tati and Talysh, though not in Gilaki and Kurmanji.
 ⟨až⟩, from, instead of ⟨az⟩. Observe also in ⟨kanīžag⟩, handmaiden, instead of ⟨kanīzag⟩ and even in ⟨društ⟩, healthy, instead of ⟨drust⟩.
 ⟨ay⟩, you are (Singular), instead of ⟨hē⟩.
 ⟨zamīg⟩, land, instead of ⟨zamīn⟩. The form ⟨zamīg⟩ can be found in Balochi. The form ⟨zamin⟩ can be found in Persian.
 ⟨hō⟩, that or the, instead of ⟨(h)ān⟩.
 The abstractive nominal suffix ⟨-īft⟩ instead of ⟨-īh⟩, as in ⟨šādīft⟩, joy, Middle Persian ⟨šādīh⟩.

Other prominent differences, not found in the text above, include the personal pronoun ⟨az⟩, I, instead of ⟨an⟩ and the present tense root of the verb ⟨kardan⟩, to do, ⟨kar-⟩ instead of Middle Persian ⟨kun-⟩. Also, the Middle Persian linking particle and relative pronoun ⟨ī(g)⟩ was not present in Parthian, but the relative pronoun ⟨čē⟩, what, was used in a similar manner.

See also
Avestan language
Old Persian language
Middle Persian
Persian language and history of Persian language
Pahlavi literature

References

Notes

Sources

External links

 Some valuable texts in Parthian including Boyce, Mary The Manichaean hymn-cycles in Parthian (London Oriental Series, Vol. 3). London: Oxford University Press, 1954.
 [ARMENIA AND IRAN iv. Iranian influences in Armenian Language Covers the massive lexical and vocabulary influences of Parthian on Armenian, (R. Schmitt, H. W. Bailey), originally published 1986.]

 
Northwestern Iranian languages
Languages attested from the 1st century BC
Language
Extinct languages of Asia
Armenian language